John Christopher Mahoney (December 19, 1882 – November 18, 1952) was a United States circuit judge of the United States Court of Appeals for the First Circuit and previously was a United States District Judge of the United States District Court for the District of Rhode Island.

Education and career

Born on December 19, 1882, in Boherbue, Cork, Ireland, Mahoney received an Artium Baccalaureus degree in 1905 from Brown University and a Bachelor of Laws in 1908 from Harvard Law School. He entered private practice in Providence, Rhode Island from 1908 to 1931. He served as an Assistant United States Attorney for the District of Rhode Island from 1917 to 1921. He served as city solicitor for Providence from 1931 to 1935.  He was a Knight of Columbus.

Federal judicial service

Mahoney was nominated by President Franklin D. Roosevelt on May 24, 1935, to a seat  on the United States District Court for the District of Rhode Island vacated by Judge Ira Lloyd Letts. He was confirmed by the United States Senate on June 4, 1935, and received his commission on June 7, 1935. His service terminated on February 21, 1940, due to his elevation to the First Circuit.

Mahoney was nominated by President Roosevelt on January 11, 1940, to a seat on the United States Court of Appeals for the First Circuit vacated by Judge James Madison Morton Jr. He was confirmed by the Senate on February 7, 1940, and received his commission on February 12, 1940. He assumed senior status due to a certified disability on December 20, 1950. His service terminated on November 18, 1952, due to his death.

See also 
Commissioner v. Boylston Market Ass'n

References

External links
 

1882 births
1952 deaths
Lawyers from Providence, Rhode Island
Brown University alumni
Harvard Law School alumni
Irish emigrants to the United States (before 1923)
Judges of the United States District Court for the District of Rhode Island
United States district court judges appointed by Franklin D. Roosevelt
Judges of the United States Court of Appeals for the First Circuit
United States court of appeals judges appointed by Franklin D. Roosevelt
20th-century American judges
Place of death missing
Assistant United States Attorneys